Elliot Opie (born 16 April 1991) is an Australian cricketer. He made his first-class debut for South Australia on 15 March 2016 in the 2015–16 Sheffield Shield.

References

External links
 

1991 births
Living people
Australian cricketers
South Australia cricketers
Cricketers from Melbourne